Marta Trancu-Rainer (1875–1950) was a Romanian surgeon.

She is known as the first woman surgeon in Romania. Her husband was Francisc Rainer.

References 

 Marcu, George (coord.) - Dicționarul personalităților feminine din România, Editura Meronia, Bucharest, 2009.

1875 births
1950 deaths
20th-century Romanian physicians
Romanian surgeons
Date of birth missing
Date of death missing
Place of birth missing
Place of death missing
Romanian women physicians
Women surgeons